See Calvi for namesakes

It is composed of three distinct villages, Petrulo, Visciano and Zuni, the latter housing the municipal seat.

History 
In the municipal territory are the remains of the ancient Roman city of Cales or Calenum, not far from Capua.

Destroyed in the 9th century by the Saracens, it was rebuilt by Atenulf I of Capua.

During the early stages of the Italian Campaign of  World War II, war pigeon G.I. Joe saved the lives of the inhabitants of the village and of the British troops occupying it. The village was scheduled to be bombarded by the Allied forces on 18 October 1943, but the message that the British had captured the village, delivered by G.I. Joe, arrived just in time to avoid the bombing. Over a thousand people, soldiers and civilians, were saved.

Twin towns 
  Forino, Italy

See also 
 Cales
 List of Catholic dioceses in Italy

References 

 

Cities and towns in Campania